Muhammad Kamri is an Indonesian footballer who plays for Gresik United in the Indonesia Super League as a midfielder.

Club career 
In December 2014, he signed with Gresik United.

References

External links 
 Profile at footballdatabase.eu
 Profile at goal.com

1979 births
Living people
People from Paser Regency
Sportspeople from East Kalimantan
Indonesian footballers
Association football midfielders
Gresik United players
Persema Malang players